Siti Noerbaja (Perfected Spelling: Siti Nurbaya) is a 1941 film from the Dutch East Indies. Directed by Lie Tek Swie, it was the first film adaptation of Marah Roesli's 1922 novel of the same name. Starring Asmanah, Momo, and Soerjono, it follows two star-crossed teenage lovers.

Plot
In Padang, childhood friends Samsoelbahri and Siti Noerbaja fall in love and kiss on the veranda, but are soon parted by their parents. Samsoelbahri goes to Batavia (Jakarta) to study, while Noerbaja must marry the contemptuous Datuk Meringgih so that he will forgive her father's debts.

Writing to Samsoelbahri, Noerbaja tells him that they can never be together as she has married. However, when she realises Merringih's violent nature she runs away to Batavia to join Samsoelbahri. They fall in love again, but must part after Noerbaja hears of her father's death. She hurries back to Padang, where Meringgih's men kill her with poisoned food. Receiving news of her death by letter, Samsu seemingly commits suicide.

Ten years later, Meringgih leads an uprising against the Dutch colonial government to protest a recent tax increase. During the uprising, Samsoelbahri (now a soldier for the Dutch) meets Meringgih and kills him, but is mortally wounded himself. After he dies he is buried next to Noerbaja.

Production

Siti Noerbaja was directed by Lie Tek Swie and produced Touw Ting Iem of Standard Film. It starred Asmanah, Momo, Soerjono, A Thys, and HA Rasjid. The black-and-white film was shot in 1941 and advertised as containing Padang-style pencak.

Siti Noerbaja was the first adaptation of Marah Roesli's 1922 novel Sitti Nurbaya. The book, which Indonesian critic Zuber Usman writes was inspired by the writer's heartbreak after his family rejected him taking a non-Minangkabau wife, was one of Balai Pustaka's most popular works, and had previously been adapted for the stage. Lie Tek Swie had previously directed two film adaptations, Njai Dasima in 1929 and Melati van Agam in 1931.

Release and legacy
Siti Noerbaja was released in late 1941, and by 23 January 1942 it had reached Surabaya. The film was Lie's last with Standard Film. He left the company soon after, with Henry L. Duarte finishing the studio's final film, Selendang Delima.

The story has been filmed twice further, as a sinetron (soap opera). The first, in 1991, was directed by Dedi Setiadi, and starred Novia Kolopaking, Gusti Randa, and HIM Damsyik. The second version, beginning in December 2004, was directed by Encep Masduki and starred Nia Ramadhani, Ser Yozha Reza, and Anwar Fuady; this series introduced a new character as a competitor for Samsoelbahri's affections.

The film is likely lost. The American visual anthropologist Karl G. Heider writes that all Indonesian films from before 1950 are lost. However, JB Kristanto's Katalog Film Indonesia (Indonesian Film Catalogue) records several as having survived at Sinematek Indonesia's archives, and Biran writes that several Japanese propaganda films have survived at the Netherlands Government Information Service.

References

Works cited

 
 
 
 

 
 

Dutch East Indies films
Films directed by Lie Tek Swie
Films based on Indonesian novels
Indonesian black-and-white films